Polygala paniculata is a species of flowering plant in the milkwort family (Polygalaceae). It is native to Central and South America and has been introduced to East Africa, South Asia, and Southeast Asia. It is an annual herb which has a height between  It is used as a medicine against snake bites and blenorrhagias. The flowers of the plant have been described as pink or white.

References

paniculata
Flora of Mexico
Flora of South America